"Don't Tread on Me" is a song by We the Kingdom that was released as the third single from their debut studio album, Holy Water (2020), on April 24, 2020. The song was written by Ed Cash, Scott Cash, Franni Cash, Martin Cash, and Andrew Bergthold.

"Don't Tread On Me" peaked at No. 40 on the US Hot Christian Songs chart.

Background
"Don't Tread on Me" was released by We the Kingdom as the third single from their debut studio album, Holy Water (2020), along with its accompanying lyric video. Ed Cash shared the message of the song, saying:

Composition
The singers' vocal range spans from D4 to C5.

Commercial performance
"Don't Tread On Me" made its debut at No. 40 on the US Hot Christian Songs chart dated August 22, 2020, following its commercial release.

Music videos
We the Kingdom released the lyric video of "Don't Tread On Me" on April 24, 2020. The live music video of the song, recorded at Young Life Sharptop Cove in Jasper, Georgia, was released on May 5, 2020, on YouTube. The Church Sessions video featuring an appearance by Maverick City Music was released on October 19, 2020. The Storybrooke Sessions video was released to YouTube on June 9, 2020.

Charts

Release history

References

External links
  on PraiseCharts

2020 songs
2020 singles
We the Kingdom songs
Songs written by Ed Cash